The University of California, Berkeley, School of Law (commonly known as Berkeley Law or UC Berkeley School of Law) is the law school of the University of California, Berkeley. It is one of 14 schools and colleges at the university. Berkeley Law is consistently ranked within the top 14 law schools in the United States.

The school was commonly referred to as "Boalt Hall" for many years, although it was never the official name. This came from its initial building, the Boalt Memorial Hall of Law, named for John Henry Boalt. This name was transferred to a new classroom wing in 1951 but was removed in 2020.

In 2019, 98 percent of graduates obtained full-time employment within nine months, with a median salary of $190,000. Of all the law schools in California, Berkeley had the highest bar passage rates in 2021 (95.5%) and 2022 (92.2%). The school offers J.D., LL.M., J.S.D. and Ph.D. degrees, and enrolls approximately 320 to 330 J.D. students in each entering class, annually, with each class being further broken down into smaller groups that take courses together.

Berkeley Law alumni include notable federal judges, politicians, Fortune 500 executives, noted legal academics and civil rights experts. Prominent alumni include Chief Justice of the United States Earl Warren, U.S. Secretary of State Dean Rusk, U.S. Attorney General Edwin Meese, U.S. Secretary of the Treasury and Chair of the Federal Reserve G. William Miller, President of the International Court of Justice Joan Donoghue, Mayor of San Francisco Ed Lee, Dallas Mavericks CEO Terdema Ussery, and Nuremberg Trials prosecutor Whitney Robson Harris.

History

The school that is today known as Berkeley Law originated in 1894 as the Department of Jurisprudence of the University of California.  The department was founded by professor William Carey Jones, who personally taught all its courses for the first three years.  According to Jones, the inspiration for the department came from his experience in 1882 teaching a course in Roman law to Berkeley seniors. Jones envisioned that the new department would be less vocational and more academic in comparison to the existing Hastings College of the Law in San Francisco.  Initially, the department was merely intended to broaden Berkeley undergraduates' academic knowledge of the law.  Students who wished to learn how to actually practice law were referred to Hastings, where coursework already completed at Berkeley could count towards earning Hastings law degrees.

In 1901, the number of faculty was increased to six by the hiring of one lecturer and two instructors, which enabled the department to offer courses adding up to two years of instruction. In 1902, the addition of four more lecturers enabled the department to provide a complete three-year law program and the referrals to Hastings were discontinued. On June 26, 1902, newspapers in San Francisco and Oakland reported that there was now a "complete law school" at Berkeley, whose graduates would be eligible to immediately apply for admission to the California bar without having to take additional courses at Hastings.  The department awarded its first law degrees in 1903 to three men, one of whom was journalist and labor activist Motoyuki Negoro. In 1906, Emmy Marcuse was the first woman to earn a law degree from the department.

The law that affiliated Hastings with UC states: "The college is affiliated with the University of California, and is the law department thereof." According to UCLA political science professor J.A.C. Grant, the law school at Berkeley was euphemistically labeled a department (or later, school) of jurisprudence for decades because it was believed UC could have only one "law department."

In 1912, the department moved into the then newly built Boalt Memorial Hall of Law at the center of the main UC Berkeley campus. This building was completed in 1911 with funds partially obtained from a donation of San Francisco land made by Elizabeth Josselyn Boalt  in memory of her late husband, John Henry Boalt, an attorney who had resided in Oakland, California until his death in 1901. Upon the move to the new building, the UC Regents designated the department as the "School of Jurisprudence".

In 1948, William Lloyd Prosser visited UCLA after he was selected to become the next Boalt Hall dean—but before formally assuming office—in order to assist with the planning for the UCLA School of Law.  During his visit, Prosser heard from Grant about how a bill had been passed to create a "school of law" at UCLA even though Hastings was supposed to be the UC "law department," decided that Berkeley could get away with the same thing, and immediately set about renaming the School of Jurisprudence to the School of Law.

In 1951, the law school moved to its current location in the southeastern section of the UC Berkeley campus. This classroom wing of the new law building was designated by the UC Regents as Boalt Hall, while the old law building was renamed "Durant Hall". (Durant Hall was subsequently rehabilitated and is still used today as office space for deans of the College of Letters and Science.) With this move, the institution was renamed again and became the "UC Berkeley School of Law".

In April 2008, the law school rebranded itself "Berkeley Law" to disentangle the confused usage which had grown over time confusing the formal name of the School of Law with the name of the building it occupied, and to more clearly align the school's name with its parent university. The administration hoped that this would improve the law school's national and international name recognition, as many individuals knew UC Berkeley had a law school but were often confused as to whether the name "Boalt Hall" referred to a separate institution. Despite the official name change, "Boalt Hall" continued to be used as the name of the law school's primary building and to refer to the law school informally for another 12 years.

By 2009, Berkeley Law was desperately short of space because the faculty had increased by about 25 percent over the past four years. The law school launched a multi-year renovation and expansion project which was eventually completed in 2012.  The most important improvement was to relocate and expand the law library into an underground facility under a new South Pavilion. Since the mid-1990s, the law library stacks had been crammed into conventional shelving in the law school's North Addition. Construction contractors dug a deep hole in the middle of the law school's courtyard, put the law library stacks two levels underground, and installed powered compact shelving units that move at the touch of a button.  At ground level, they built a glass pavilion housing classrooms, a student lounge, and a cafe, all of which is topped off by a rooftop garden accessible by a second-floor bridge.  The North Addition is now home to the Robbins Collection (a separate library of religious and civil law materials) and the Visiting Scholar Program.

On January 30, 2020, the UC Regents completely removed the name "Boalt Hall" from Berkeley's primary law school building and in all references made to the law school. The de-naming was the outcome of a nearly three-year process launched after a UC Berkeley lecturer discovered writings by John Henry Boalt expressing flagrantly racist views. In an e-mail sent to the university at the time, UC Berkeley Chancellor Carol Christ wrote, "Boalt made profoundly offensive and racist statements about Chinese and Chinese Americans, suggesting that it would be better to 'exterminate' those of Chinese descent than to have them assimilate." The university also found that Boalt had no other historical legacy than his racism, and that naming the building after him had not been a condition of his widow's donation. This was the first time in UC Berkeley's history that the name of a building had been removed because its namesake's values did not align with those of the university. Going forward, the law school building will now be known simply as the Law Building. (UCLA and UC Irvine have always used the term "Law Building" to describe the homes of their respective law schools.)

Admissions
The J.D. program's admissions process is highly selective, with Berkeley Law admitting 22% of all applicants who applied in 2020. Berkeley Law is known to value high undergraduate GPAs. The 25th and 75th Law School Admission Test (LSAT) percentiles for the Class of 2023 were 163 and 170, respectively, with a median of 168. The 25th and 75th undergraduate GPA percentiles were 3.65 and 3.92, respectively, with a median of 3.81.

For a typical class in the J.D. program, the average age of admitted students is 25 years old, with ages ranging from 21 to 46 years old. The student-faculty ratio is nearly 6:1. Berkeley Law is unique among most law schools for having a class usually composed of 60% women and 40% men.

Academics

Berkeley Law has approximately 850 J.D. students, 200 students in the LL.M. and J.S.D. programs, and 45 students in the Ph.D. program in Jurisprudence and Social Policy. The School also features specialized curricular programs in Business, Law and Economics, Comparative Legal Studies, Environmental Law, Public Interest & Social Justice, Critical Race Studies, International Legal Studies, and Law and Technology.

Berkeley Law's grading system for the J.D. program is unusual among most law schools but similar to the grading system used at Yale Law School, Harvard Law School, and Stanford Law School. Students are graded on a High Honors (HH), Honors (H), and Pass (P) scale. Approximately 60% of the students in each class receive a grade of Pass, 30% receive a grade of Honors, and the highest 10% receive a grade of High Honors; lower grades of Substandard Pass (or Pass Conditional, abbreviated PC) and No Credit (NC) may be awarded at the discretion of professors. The top student in each class or section receives the Jurisprudence Award, while the second-place student receives the Prosser Prize.

The faculty of Berkeley Law also provide academic direction and the bulk of the instruction for the undergraduate program in Legal Studies, which is organized as a major in Letters and Science. The Legal Studies program is not intended as a pre-law program, but rather as a liberal arts program "that can encourage sustained reflection on fundamental values."

Berkeley Law has a chapter of the Order of the Coif, a national law school honorary society founded for the purposes of encouraging legal scholarship and advancing the ethical standards of the legal profession.

The law school has been American Bar Association approved since 1923. It joined the Association of American Law Schools (AALS) in 1912.

Berkeley Law offers combined degree programs with other schools within both the UC Berkeley campus and the broader University of California system, as well as joint master's degrees with Tufts University and Harvard University.

Post-graduation employment
In 2018, the school's bar passage rate was 90.9%.

According to Berkeley's official ABA-required disclosures, over 90 percent of 2018 graduates obtained full-time, long-term, bar admission-required employment nine months after graduation.

Rankings

Since the inception of the U.S. News & World Report law school rankings in the late 1980s, Berkeley Law has consistently ranked within the prestigious "T14" (top 14) group of schools. For the 2022–2023 academic year, USNWR ranked Berkeley Law as the ninth-best law school in the United States. In addition, USNWR ranked Berkeley Law first in corporate, IP, and environmental law and second in criminal law.

In 2020, QS World Rankings ranked Berkeley Law as the seventh-best law school in the world.

Berkeley Law's flagship journal, the California Law Review, is ranked third and fifth in the United States in studies conducted by researchers at Washington & Lee University and the University of Oregon, respectively.

According to Brian Leiter's 2012 scholarly impact study, Berkeley Law ranks seventh in terms of scholarly impact as measured by the percentage of tenured faculty represented in specific specialty areas.

Costs
Berkeley Law's tuition has increased in recent years. Currently, tuition and fees are $49,364 per year (in-state) and $53,315 per year (out-of-state). Most out-of-state students may claim in-state status in their second year of study.

The total cost of attendance (adding estimated living expenses to the aforementioned tuition and fees) at Berkeley Law for the 2018–2019 academic year is $85,315 for California residents and $89,266 for non-residents. The Law School Transparency estimated debt-financed cost of attendance for three years is $282,442 for residents and $296,694 for non-residents.

For students working in public interest law who will earn less than $70,000 annually, Berkeley Law offers a ten-year loan repayment assistance program (LRAP).

Scholarships are offered on the basis of both merit and need. Named prizes include the Berkeley Law Opportunity Scholarship, which provides full tuition to first-generation college students, and the Hyundai-Kia Scholarships, which are given to students who demonstrate sustained and unique interest in law and technology. Stipends are also awarded for summer public service internships.

Clinical and research opportunities

Berkeley Law hosts over 21 centers, six primary clinics, and a five-area domestic and international field placement program for experiential learning in specific areas of the law. These institutes are located both on the UC Berkeley campus and in other regions of the greater San Francisco Bay Area, and are often conducted through partnerships with attorneys, interest groups, law firms, and corporations throughout Northern California and the United States. In addition to these centers, students are given the ability and funding to create "SLPs", or student-initiated legal services projects.

Business and Economics
The Berkeley Center for Law and Business was established in 2004 and is the Law School's focal point for experiential learning in corporate law. It focus on issues of corporate governance, mergers and acquisitions, financial fraud prosecution, capital markets, cybersecurity, antitrust compliance, and venture capital investments. The program also hosts the joint J.D./M.B.A. degree with Berkeley Law's adjoining Haas School of Business and national competitions for corporate negotiation.

Other centers in business law include the Robert D. Burch Center for Tax Policy and Public Finance (established in 1994) and the Law, Economics, and Politics Center.

Constitutional, Regulatory, and Policy
Constitutional and regulatory law centers at Berkeley include the new Berkeley Center for Consumer Law and Economic Justice that was founded in 2018, the Berkeley Judicial Institute, and the California Constitution Center, which is the only non-profit organization dedicated to the study of the Constitution of California. In addition to housing chapters of the American Constitution Society and The Federalist Society, the Law School enables interested students to spend a semester studying constitutional and regulatory law at the University of California's Washington campus, and hosts civil field placements and externships with the offices of various judges, United States Attorneys, Attorneys General, and other government offices.

Other policy centers at the Law School include the Center for the Study of Law and Society (established in 1961), the Kadish Center for Morality, Law and Public Affairs (established in 2000), a center dedicated to data on redistricting and voting rights, and the Institute for Legal Research.

Social Justice and Public Interest
Berkeley Law has several clinical programs and centers that allow students to gain practical experience advocating for social justice and assisting low-income or marginalized individuals. These opportunities include the Death Penalty Clinic, Policy Advocacy Clinic, Veterans Law Practicum, and Domestic Law Violence Practicum. Many clinics, externships, field placements, and programs are hosted in partnership with the nearby East Bay Community Law Center (EBCLC), which provides legal aid for disadvantaged Alameda County residents. Students can work with the EBCLC on issues such as juvenile justice, expungement of minor crimes, housing law, tax assistance, and small business establishment.

Berkeley Law also hosts multiple centers, institutes, and initiatives producing research and scholarship on issues such as criminal justice reform, access to civil justice, and more. These centers include the Thelton Henderson Center for Social Justice, Civil Justice Research Initiative, Center on Race, Sexuality & Culture, Center on Reproductive Rights and Justice, and the Public Law and Policy Program.

Environmental
The Center for Law, Energy & the Environment and the Environmental Law Clinic focus on legal solutions to climate change, sustainable power use, renewable energy, and ocean health.

International and Comparative
Berkeley Law's international law program encompasses the International Human Rights Law Clinic (established in 1998), the Human Rights Center, the Robbins Collection, and an LL.M. program. These organizations and programs develop policy solutions for human rights causes, promote global human rights and international justice through advocacy, investigate war crimes and serious violations of human rights, and sponsor comparative research and study in the fields of religious and civil law. The Human Rights Center previously won a MacArthur Award for Creative and Effective Institutions. In addition, the centers in this area train students for moot court competitions focused on international law.

Other international law centers within Berkeley Law include the Berkeley Institute for Jewish Law and Israel Studies and the Korea Law Center, as well as the Sho Sato Program in Japanese and US Law, named after co-founder Professor Sho Sato (1924-1986).

Technology

The Berkeley Center for Law and Technology was established in 1996. Issues addressed by this center and its affiliates, such as the Samuelson Law, Technology, and Public Policy Clinic (founded in 2000) and the Miller Institute for Global Challenges and the Law, include intellectual property, privacy, patents, healthcare law, and digital entertainment.

Law journals

California Law Review

Established in 1912, the California Law Review is the flagship journal of Berkeley Law. The application process consists of an anonymous write-on competition, with grades playing no role in the consideration of membership. A personal statement is also considered.

Berkeley Journal of Criminal Law
Berkeley Journal of Criminal Law was first established in 2000. The journal publishes work concerning emerging issues of both substantive and procedural criminal law, as well as criminal justice issues unique to California and the Western United States. The journal publishes a fall edition in January and a spring edition in June every year and is completely digital.

Berkeley Journal of Employment & Labor Law
Berkeley Journal of Employment & Labor Law was first established in 1975 and publishes articles focusing on current developments in labor and employment law. Typical articles in the journal cover legal issues dealing with employment discrimination, "traditional" labor law, public sector employment, international and comparative labor law, employee benefits, and the evolution of the doctrine of wrongful termination. In addition to scholarly articles, the journal includes student-authored comments, book reviews and essays. It is published twice a year.

Berkeley Journal of International Law
Berkeley Journal of International Law was first established in 1982 and covers public and private international law and comparative law. It also publishes reviews of new books in the field, and is published twice yearly.

Berkeley Technology Law Journal
Berkeley Technology Law Journal began in 1986 and covers emerging issues of law in the areas of intellectual property, cyber law, information law, biotechnology, antitrust, and telecommunications law. The journal appears quarterly.

Ecology Law Quarterly
Ecology Law Quarterly began in 1971 and is Berkeley Law's journal focusing on environmental and energy law. Analysis in the journal includes short-form commentary and analysis of court decisions and policies relating to environmental law.

Berkeley Business Law Journal
Berkeley Business Law Journal was first established in 2004, and is one of the largest journals at the law school with over 100 members. It publishes an annual print journal and blog (called The Network) and connects students to pro­fessors and practition­ers in the corporate law space through on-campus symposia and events.

Other journals
Other student-run legal publications include the Asian American Law Journal, Berkeley Journal of African-American Law & Policy, Berkeley Journal of Entertainment & Sports Law, Berkeley Journal of Gender, Law & Justice, Berkeley Journal of Middle Eastern & Islamic Law, and Berkeley La Raza Law Journal.

Alumni

Berkeley Law has produced a substantial number of prominent alumni at all levels of government, jurisprudence, business, legal practice, academia, and society. For a full register of all notable Berkeley Law graduates, see this list of Berkeley Law alumni.

In domestic government and politics, the law school has produced numerous influential individuals from both the Democratic Party and Republican Party. Several state governors and United States Senators, including Earl Warren and Pete Wilson of California, Neil Goldschmidt of Oregon, and Peter Welch of Vermont are graduates of Berkeley Law. The law school has also graduated a substantial number of officials who have served at the U.S. Cabinet level. Included are  U.S. Secretary of State Dean Rusk, who served in the Kennedy administration and Johnson administration, U.S. Secretary of the Treasury and Chairman of the Federal Reserve G. William Miller, who served in the Carter administration, and U.S. Attorney General Edwin Meese III, who served in the Reagan administration. Beyond these individuals, many Berkeley graduates have had the opportunity to work in the U.S. federal government in various prominent roles, including as Assistant U.S. Attorney General, Solicitor General of the United States, Assistant Secretary of State, U.S. ambassador, United States Attorney, Chief Technology Officer of the United States, cabinet undersecretaries, Chair of the Federal Deposit Insurance Corporation, and members of the United States Congress. Moreover, Berkeley Law has also produced a substantial number of graduates who have served as state attorneys general, state cabinet officers, members of state legislatures, mayors, and city attorneys across the United States.

Berkeley Law has also produced various international leaders, including Nuremberg Trials prosecutor Whitney Robson Harris and Deputy Prime Minister of Thailand Wissanu Krea-ngam.

On the judicial bench, Berkeley Law has produced a U.S. Supreme Court Justice, Earl Warren, and scores of federal appellate and district judges, state supreme court justices, and international arbitrators. These graduates encompass current influential federal judges Miranda Du, Amul Thapar, Vince Chhabria, Marsha Berzon, and Evan Wallach. In international courts, alumni include High Court judge Sir Rabinder Singh, the highest-ranking judge of Asian descent in British history, and Reynato S. Puno, the former Chief Justice of the Philippines.

Among dozens of prominent Berkeley Law graduates in academia are international arbitrator David Caron, William and Mary Law School professor Nancy Combs, and Upendra Baxi, who has served as a dean or professor at over nine law schools in India, the United Kingdom and the United States.

And within the business, journalism and nonprofit sectors, Berkeley Law has taught significant numbers of students who have gone on to become CEOs and general counsels for Fortune 500 companies and other businesses, executives and founders of NGOs, and award-winning journalists. Included are Paula Boggs, Executive Vice President and General Counsel for Starbucks Corporation, Jess Bravin of The Wall Street Journal, Mitchell Baker, current CEO and Executive Chair of the Mozilla Corporation, and James Cavallaro, who served as President of the Inter-American Commission on Human Rights.

Notable faculty

David E. Feller was a renowned labor law expert and professor emeritus of Boalt Hall when he passed away in 2003. He was a prominent member of the Boalt faculty for over 35 years and a revered practitioner in the field of labor law for nearly two decades prior to coming to Boalt. Professor Feller’s distinguished career included serving as general counsel to the United Steelworkers and the Industrial Union Department of the AFL-CIO, arguing several important cases before the United States Supreme Court, and participating significantly in ground-breaking civil rights litigation in the 1950s

In popular culture

 Billy McBride, the attorney protagonist of the Amazon series Goliath played by Billy Bob Thornton (and which Thornton won a Golden Globe Award for Best Actor – Television Series Drama for portraying) is a Berkeley Law alumnus. In Season 3, Episode 4, "Full Circle", McBride goes through a box of law school mementos that include a page-flagged Constitutional Law casebook and a folded-up piece of paper with the words "Boalt Hall" on it. Also in Season 2, Episode 1, "La Mano", a "University of California" diploma can be seen hanging from the wall of McBride's makeshift office (that operates out of a room in the Ocean Lodge Hotel). By process of elimination, this is a law degree diploma because in the pilot (Season 1, Episode 1, "Of Mice and Men"), McBride mentions he "went to college" at, and graduated with an undergraduate degree from Indiana University (where he also played baseball). The series creator Jonathan Shapiro is a Berkeley Law alumnus as well. 
 Sandy Cohen, a character on the popular television series The O.C., is a lawyer and Berkeley Law alumnus. "The O.C. at Boalt" is a student group that, in addition to screening episodes of The O.C. during the lunch period, offers the Sandy Cohen Fellowship, a summer grant for students who plan to work as public defenders (on The O.C., Sandy Cohen worked as a public defender while living in Orange County). In recent years, "The O.C. at Boalt" has also managed to bring Peter Gallagher, the actor who plays Sandy Cohen, to UC Berkeley School of Law to speak on an annual basis.
 Matthew Perry played a Republican graduate of UC Berkeley School of Law on multiple episodes of The West Wing.
 Kelly Rutherford played lawyer Samantha "Sonny" Liston, a graduate of UC Berkeley School of Law, on E-Ring.
 Joanie Caucus, a character in Garry Trudeau's comic strip Doonesbury, attended UC Berkeley School of Law.
 In Catch Me If You Can, Martin Sheen plays Roger Strong, the District Attorney of New Orleans and a UC Berkeley School of Law alumnus.
 In the movie Intolerable Cruelty, a copy of the California Law Review is featured prominently on a table in the senior partner's office.
Judy Carrier, a major continuing character in Lisa Scottoline's novels about Rosato & Associates— an all-woman law firm in Philadelphia, received her degree from UC Berkeley School of Law.
Pete Harrison, played by Bradley Whitford, was the leading role in the hit show Trophy Wife, and was a Berkeley Law graduate. He dons a Berkeley Law sweatshirt in the first season.

References

External links

 

California, Berkeley
California, Berkeley
University of California, Berkeley
Boalt
1894 in law
California, Berkeley
Environmental law schools
Law in the San Francisco Bay Area
1894 establishments in California